Super Love or Superlove may refer to:

Film and TV
Superlove (1999 film) :fr:Superlove 1999 Grégoire Colin, Isabelle Carré, Catherine Hosmalin
Superlove (2002 film) List of Estonian animated films

Music
Superlove Records, Italy, artists including Julie's Haircut

Albums
Superlove, album by Ass Ponys 1993
 Superlove Ștefan Bănică, Jr. 2010

Songs
 "Super Love" (Exile song), 1986
 "Super Love" (Johnny Gill song), 1983
 "Super Love", a 2002 song by Celine Dion from A New Day Has Come
 "Super Love" (Dami Im song), 2014
 "Superlove" (Lenny Kravitz song), 2011
 "SuperLove", song by Charli XCX
 "Super Love Song", song by B'z
 "Superlove" (Tinashe song)
 "Superlove", song by End of Fashion from Holiday Trip of a Lifetime
 "Superlove", song by David and the Giants
 "Superlove", song by Malurt
 "Superlove", song by New York Skyy
 "Mr. Superlove", song by The Afghan Whigs